The Price of Money is a collaboration album between American rappers The Jacka & 12 Gauge Shotie, released on January 20, 2009. It peaked at #88 on the R&B/Hip-Hop Albums chart, making it 12 Gauge Shotie's first and only charting album to date. The album cover is an homage to the famed American game show The Price Is Right.

A music video has been filmed for the song "Should I".

"Sunshine" contains samples from the 1976 song "Sunshine" by the group Enchantment (band)

"Paper Long" contains samples from I Want You Back by The Jackson 5

"Dayz Like This" contains samples of Just to Keep You Satisfied by Marvin Gaye

"All My N*ggaz" contains samples of "I'll Be The Other Woman" by The Soul Children

Track listing

References

2009 albums
Collaborative albums
The Jacka albums